Aqa Bolaghi (also Romanized as Āqā Bolāghī) is a village in Gol Tappeh Rural District, Gol Tappeh District, Kabudarahang County, Hamadan Province, Iran. At the 2006 census, its population was 290, in 62 families.

References 

Populated places in Kabudarahang County